= Cochise County Community College District =

Higher administration unit in Arizona, United States

Coordinates: 31°52′50″N 109°45′13″W

Cochise County Community College District is a school district in Cochise County, Arizona.
